National Front of Workers and Peasants was a political party in Peru founded in 1962 in Puno by the brothers Néstor, Róger and Luis Cáceres Velásquez.

FNTC publishes Nueva Izquierda (New Left).

Political parties established in 1962
Political parties disestablished in 1999
Defunct political parties in Peru
1962 establishments in Peru
Socialist parties in Peru